Claudio Marcelo Morel Rodríguez (born 2 February 1978) is a Paraguayan former footballer.

He holds the player record for Copa Sudamericano wins with three  - with San Lorenzo in 2002, and Boca Juniors in 2004 and 2005.

He also played as a left back for the Paraguay national team. He is the son of ex-Paraguayan footballer Eugenio Morel.

Career

Club career

San Lorenzo
Morel Rodríguez started his career in Argentina with San Lorenzo in the Primera División. In the 2000–01 season he won the Clausura with San Lorenzo, and in 2001 he helped them win the Copa Mercosur, beating Brazilian club Flamengo in the final.

He scored his first goal for the club on 5 October 2002 in a 2–1 win over Newell's Old Boys at the Estadio Pedro Bidegain. He won the 2002 Copa Sudamericana with the club, beating Atlético Nacional of Colombia 4–0 in the final in November 2002.

He scored one more goal for San Lorenzo also in the 2002–03 season, and also against Newell's Old Boys, in a 2–1 defeat on 2 May 2003 at the Estadio Newell's Old Boys.

Boca Juniors
He moved to Boca Juniors in 2004 and made his Boca debut in a 0–0 draw against Lanús on 15 August 2004. His first trophy with Boca came in 2004 when the club won the Copa Sudamericana, by beating Bolivian club Bolivar 2–1 over two legs in the final. In 2005, he won the Recopa Sudamericana and the Copa Sudamericana as well as winning both the 2005 Apertura and the 2006 Clausura in the 2005–2006 season. He won the Recopa Sudamericana 2006 with Boca, beating São Paulo 4–3 on aggregate.

On 10 February 2007, Morel scored his first goal with Boca Juniors in a 4–0 victory over Banfield, later that year in December he played in the 2007 FIFA Club World Cup in Japan and helped Boca to the runners-up spot, losing to Italian club A.C. Milan 4–2 in the final.

He was runner-up behind fellow Paraguayan Salvador Cabañas in the 2007 South American Footballer of the Year award. He was also selected in the "Ideal Eleven of South America in 2007". In August 2008 he helped Boca win the 2008 Recopa Sudamericana, beating fellow Argentine club Arsenal 5–3 on aggregate. In December 2008 he was chosen as the Paraguayan footballer of the year by the press.

On 20 June 2010, prior to Paraguay's group match against Slovakia at the 2010 FIFA World Cup, Boca Juniors announced they would not renew Morel Rodríguez' contract.

Return to Paraguay
In 2015, he and Sol de América colleague Aureliano Torres both joined 12 de Octubre of the División Intermedia.

International career
He made his international debut in 1999.

Morel Rodríguez also represented Paraguay U23 at the 2000 CONMEBOL Men Pre-Olympic Tournament, making three appearances.

He played in the 2002 World Cup qualifiers, and has played in the qualifying games for the 2010 World Cup.

Later and coaching career
After a spell at Sarmiento de Leones, Morel began playing for Argentine amateur club San Eliseo in San Vicente. In the beginning of 2019 it was reported, that Morel had been appointed manager of the club.

In August 2020, there were rumors about Morel would be appointed manager of Ciclón de Tarija. However, the rumors was never officially confirmed.

In February 2021, Morel returned to Boca Juniors as a youth coach.

Honours
San Lorenzo
Argentine Primera División: 2001 Clausura
Copa Mercosur: 2001
Copa Sudamericana: 2002

Boca Juniors
Argentine Primera División: 2005 Apertura, 2006 Clausura, 2008 Apertura
Copa Sudamericana: 2004, 2005
Recopa Sudamericana: 2005, 2006, 2008
Copa Libertadores: 2007

Individual
Paraguayan Footballer of the Year: 2008

Career statistics

Club
Estadísticas actualizadas a la fecha: 29 de mayo de 2012.
 1Las copas locales se refieren a la Copa del Rey.
 2Las competiciones internacionales se refieren a la Copa Libertadores, Copa Sudamericana, Copa Mercosur, Mundial de Clubes y Recopa Sudamericana.

See also
 Players and Records in Paraguayan Football

References

External links
 Deportivo official profile 
 Argentine Primera statistics at Fútbol XXI  
 
 
 
 
 

1978 births
Living people
Sportspeople from Asunción
Paraguayan footballers
Association football defenders
Argentine Primera División players
San Lorenzo de Almagro footballers
Boca Juniors footballers
La Liga players
Segunda División players
Deportivo de La Coruña players
Paraguay international footballers
2007 Copa América players
2010 FIFA World Cup players
Paraguayan expatriate footballers
Expatriate footballers in Argentina
Expatriate footballers in Spain